The Argentine Basketball Confederation (CABB) is the governing body of basketball in Argentina. It is also one of the founding members of the International Basketball Federation (FIBA), in 1932.

It is a member of the FIBA Americas, and it is responsible for the Men's and the Women's national teams. Currently there are approximately 1,200 clubs registered with the association, as well as 130,500 male and 11,000 female players.

Composition
The CABB is composed of 24 Provincial Federations, as well as the "Asociación de Clubes de Básquetbol" which organises the first and second division league championships. On the other hand, the CABB itself organises the third division of club basketball, "Liga Federal de Básquetbol". The body also organises women's championship as "Liga Federal Femenina de Básquetbol".

In youth divisions, the CABB organises U19, U17 and other youth championships, including a female tournament.

Unlike men's basketball, the women's division consists of only one national federation.

See also
Basketball in Argentina

References

External links
 

1929 establishments in Argentina
Basketball governing bodies in South America
Federation
Argentina
Basketball
Sports organizations established in 1932